The 2022–23 New Hampshire Wildcats Men's ice hockey season was the 97th season of play for the program and the 39th in the Hockey East conference. The Wildcats represented the University of New Hampshire and were coached by Mike Souza, in his 5th season.

Season

Departures

Recruiting

Roster
As of August 23, 2022.

Standings

Schedule and results

|-
!colspan=12 style=";" | Regular Season

|-
!colspan=12 style=";" |

Scoring statistics

Goaltending statistics

Rankings

References

2022-23
New Hampshire Wildcats
New Hampshire Wildcats
New Hampshire Wildcats
New Hampshire Wildcats